The 1992–93 season was Paris Saint-Germain's 23rd season in existence. PSG played their home league games at the Parc des Princes in Paris, registering an average attendance of 26,693 spectators per match. The club was presided by Michel Denisot and the team was coached by Artur Jorge. Paul Le Guen was the team captain.

Summary

Led by Bernard Lama, who replaced the recently retired Joël Bats in goal, fellow French talents Alain Roche and Vincent Guérin, and prolific Liberian marksman George Weah, the Red and Blues reached a European semifinal for the first time in their history in 1992–93. After an easy first round against PAOK, PSG defeated Napoli and Anderlecht — two resounding European names but whose best days had already passed — and qualified for the quarterfinals of the UEFA Cup where they were paired with the great Real Madrid.

The Parisians fell to a 3–1 defeat in the first leg at the Santiago Bernabéu Stadium, seriously complicating their chances of qualification. PSG learned their lesson, though, and managed arguably their most famous comeback ever in the second leg. They were 3–0 up in added time with goals from George Weah, David Ginola and Valdo, when the Spanish side pulled one back, momentarily forcing extra time. Paris were given a free kick near Real's area in the final seconds of regular time and Antoine Kombouaré, just like against Anderlecht in the previous round, rose higher than anyone else to send his team to the semifinals with a fantastic header that made him a club legend. PSG supporters nicknamed him "Gold Helmet" after this goal. Unfortunately, PSG's fairy tale ended in the last four against eventual winners Juventus, in the last four.

In France, the capital outfit defeated Nantes in the 1993 Coupe de France Final (3–0), claiming its third cup title overall without conceding a single goal throughout the entire competition, a record only matched by Paris Saint-Germain itself in 2017. Coincidentally, the victory came almost exactly ten years after their last French Cup title in 1983, won against Nantes as well. It was the club's first trophy since 1986 as well as the first of the Canal+ era.

This campaign also marked the beginning of Le Classique, the rivalry between PSG and Marseille, as both teams battled each other on the field for the league crown. The first match, played at the Parc des Princes on December 18, 1992, was so brutal that earned itself the nickname "The Butchery of 1992." It was on this day that the French clásico was born. Artur Jorge announced his side would crush OM, while David Ginola promised war upon them. To motivate his players, Marseille president Bernard Tapie stuck the newspaper articles with PSG's provocations in the dressing room. OM would not disappoint him, walking away with the victory (0–1) in what was an extremely violent match with more than 50 fouls.

In the second match, league leaders Marseille welcomed closest challengers PSG at the Stade Vélodrome in a match that would determine the title. Paris quickly took the lead, only for OM to hit back with three goals and clinch what would have been their fifth consecutive championship (1–3). Shortly after, however, Marseille and Tapie were found guilty of match-fixing. The French Football Federation stripped OM of their trophy and offered it to second-placed PSG, who refused it because Canal+ did not want to anger their subscribers in Marseille. As a result, the 1993 title remains unattributed. Canal+ even refused letting Paris participate in next season's UEFA Champions League after UEFA excluded OM from the competition. Third-placed Monaco took the spot instead. Marseille and their fans have since accused PSG of plotting against them to become the new kings of French football.

Players 
As of the 1992–93 season.

Squad

Out on loan

Transfers 

As of the 1992–93 season.

Arrivals

Departures

Kits 

American electronics manufacturer Commodore and French soft-drink brand Tourtel were the shirt sponsors. American sportswear brand Nike was the kit manufacturer.

Friendly tournaments

Tournoi de Sedan

Tournoi de Paris

Competitions

Overview

Division 1

League table

Results by round

Matches

Coupe de France

UEFA Cup

First round

Second round

Third round

Quarter-finals

Semi-finals

Statistics 

As of the 1992–93 season.

Appearances and goals 

|-
!colspan="16" style="background:#dcdcdc; text-align:center"|Goalkeepers

|-
!colspan="16" style="background:#dcdcdc; text-align:center"|Defenders

|-
!colspan="16" style="background:#dcdcdc; text-align:center"|Midfielders

|-
!colspan="16" style="background:#dcdcdc; text-align:center"|Forwards

|-

References

External links 

Official websites
 PSG.FR - Site officiel du Paris Saint-Germain
 Paris Saint-Germain - Ligue 1 
 Paris Saint-Germain - UEFA.com

Paris Saint-Germain F.C. seasons
Paris Saint-Germain